The 1933 Virginia Cavaliers football team represented the University of Virginia during the 1933 college football season. The Cavaliers were led by third-year head coach Fred Dawson and played their home games at Scott Stadium in Charlottesville, Virginia. They competed as members of the Southern Conference, finishing with a conference record of 1–3–1 and a 2–6–2 record overall. After the season, Dawson resigned as head coach. He had an overall record of 8–17–4 at Virginia.

Schedule

References

Virginia
Virginia Cavaliers football seasons
Virginia Cavaliers football